Rockwood Village is a neighbourhood in the eastern part of the City of Mississauga, Ontario, in the Regional Municipality of Peel. Its approximate boundaries are Eglinton Avenue in the north, Burnhamthorpe Road in the south, the Etobicoke Creek (the city limits of Mississauga) on the east and Dixie Road on the west. The Municipal Ward is Ward 3, the Ontario Provincial Riding is Mississauga East—Cooksville (provincial electoral district) and the Canadian Federal Riding is Mississauga East—Cooksville. The Burnhamthorpe branch of the Mississauga Library System is located at the southwestern edge of Rockwood Village at the corner of Burnhamthorpe Road and Dixie Road.

History
The historic hamlet of Burnhamthorpe was located at the corner of today's Burnhamthorpe Road and Dixie Road, at the southwestern edge of the neighbourhood. The area took in part of Lots 5 and 6, Concessions 1 and 2, NDS (North of Dundas Street). Founded about 1820, it was originally named Sandy Hill, but when a post office opened in 1862, a post office conflict with Sandhill in Chinguacousy Township occurred, so it was renamed Burnhamthorpe at the suggestion of John Abelson who hailed from Burnham Thorpe, England. 
 
When Samuel Wilmot laid out the roadways in the 1805 Purchase survey, roads ran east and west and lines ran north and south. Third Line East became Dixie Road, and Back Line Road and Base Line (the latter named as such because it was the boundary between the old and new township surveys) became Burnhamthorpe Road and Eglinton Avenue respectively.  

The 1877 Peel Atlas shows Samuel Moore Lot 6, Concession 2 (100 acres) on the Northwest Corner of modern-day Dixie Road and Burnhamthorpe Road. George Chadwick has Lot 5, Concession 2 on the Northeast corner, William Shaver has Lot 6, Concession 1 on the Southwest corner and William Clarkson has Lot 5, Concession 1 on the Southeast corner. 1877 Peel Atlas:
 
List of Burnhamthorpe properties in 1877 in the area that became Rockwood Village:

The name Rockwood Village was coined as the area was planned and developed in the 1960s and 1970s.

Rockwood Homeowners' Association 

The Rockwood Homeowners' Association is a community group composed of homeowners living within the Rockwood Village. The Association was founded in 1997 and is focused on resolving community issues and improving resident living. The Rockwood Homeowners' Association provides residents with information on community living and events through the publishing of their quarterly newsletter, The Rockwood Times.  The newsletter is published by the Rockwood Homeowners' Association board members and is provided to all residents living within the Rockwood Village. The Rockwood Homeowners' Association holds an Annual General Meeting for all community members to attend.

Development

Mississauga BRT

The Mississauga Transitway is a bus-only roadway under construction in Mississauga, Ontario that will be used by Mississauga MiWay and GO Transit. The dedicated route of Mississauga Bus Rapid Transit (BRT) would extend from Renforth Drive in the East to Winston Churchill Boulevard in the West. There would be 12 BRT stations (from East to West): Renforth Drive, Orbitor, Spectrum, Etobicoke Creek, Tahoe (was Fieldgate), Dixie, Tomken, Cawthra, Central Parkway, City Centre, Erin Mills and Winston Churchill.

Rockwood will be served by the Tahoe and Dixie stations. Dixie will have 170 parking spots and Go Transit will stop there.

References

External links 
1877 Peel Atlas: Toronto Township Southern Half
PDF of Malton:Farms to Flying Book by Kathleen A. Hicks published 2006
PDF of “Lakeview: Journey from Yesterday” by Kathleen A. Hicks published 2005
PDF of “Dixie: Orchards to Industry” by Kathleen Hicks published 2006
PDF of “Dixie: Orchards to Industry including Burnhamthorpe by Kathleen Hicks published 2006
Mississauga Heritage article on Burnhamthorpe
Rockwood Homeowners Association
Mississauga News Article August 28 – Mississauga carved up in new riding proposals
Redistribution Federal Electoral Districts – Ontario
Electoral Districts Mississauga–Brampton South – Existing Boundaries
Electoral Districts Mississauga East—Cooksville – Proposed Boundaries
Mississauga Bus Rapid Transit (BRT)
Mississauga MiWay and GO Transit Route and Stations
BRT Detailed Design Concept Plans
Design Plan – Eastgate Pkwy – Cawthra to Fieldgate Section
Rockwood Area Residents Reject Proposed Forest Park Circle Development – The Mississauga News October 19, 2012

Neighbourhoods in Mississauga